Baktalórántháza is a district in central part of Szabolcs-Szatmár-Bereg County. Baktalórántháza is also the name of the town where the district seat is found. The district is located in the Northern Great Plain Statistical Region. This district is a part of Nyírség geographical region.

Geography 
Baktalórántháza District borders with Kisvárda District to the north, Vásárosnamény District and Mátészalka District to the east, Nyírbátor District and Nagykálló District to the south, Nyíregyháza District and Kemecse District to the west. The number of the inhabited places in Baktalórántháza District is 12.

Municipalities 
The district has 1 town, 1 large village and 10 villages.
(ordered by population, as of 1 January 2013)

The bolded municipality is city, italics municipality is large village.

Demographics

In 2011, it had a population of 19,123 and the population density was 75/km².

Ethnicity
Besides the Hungarian majority, the main minority is the Roma (approx. 2,000).

Total population (2011 census): 19,123
Ethnic groups (2011 census): Identified themselves: 19,254 persons:
Hungarians: 17,144 (89.04%)
Gypsies: 1,942 (10.09%)
Others and indefinable: 168 (0.87%)
Approx. 150 persons in Baktalórántháza District did declare more than one ethnic group at the 2011 census.

Religion
Religious adherence in the county according to 2011 census:

Catholic – 7,893 (Roman Catholic – 4,302; Greek Catholic – 3,590);
Reformed – 6,893;
Evangelical – 44;
other religions – 334;
Non-religious – 565; 
Atheism – 20;
Undeclared – 3,374.

Gallery

See also
List of cities and towns of Hungary

References

External links
 Postal codes of the Baktalórántháza District

Districts in Szabolcs-Szatmár-Bereg County